Leonard Marcus may refer to:
 Leonard S. Marcus (born 1950), American author
 Leonard J. Marcus (born 1952), American social scientist and administrator